Pish Khowr may refer to:
 Pish Khowr District
 Pish Khowr Rural District